SBE may refer to:

Science, medicine, and technology 

 Sacred Books of the East
 Semiconductor Bloch equations
 Social, behavioral, environmental and medical sciences
 Society of Broadcast Engineers
 Specification by example, in software development
 Subacute bacterial endocarditis

Engineering consultants 

 SBE, Studiebureau voor Bouwkunde en Expertises, Sint-Niklaas, Belgium

Other uses 

 SBE Entertainment Group, Los Angeles, US
 Scarborough Board of Education, Ontario, Canada
 South by east, a point of the compass